= Solid-state memory =

Solid-state memory can mean:

- Random-access memory using integrated circuits
- Solid-state drive
